David Smith (1871–unknown) was a Scottish footballer who played in the Football League for Preston North End.

References

1871 births
Date of death unknown
Scottish footballers
English Football League players
Association football forwards
Preston North End F.C. players